The Overmuch Box celebrates the 25 years of the Danish rock band D-A-D and was released on November 16, 2009.
It is a release of their complete studio works up to 2009, containing 10 remastered studio albums plus rarities. However, the set does not include the band's live material.

Remastered albums
 Call of the Wild (1985)
 D.A.D. Draws a Circle (1987)
 No Fuel Left for the Pilgrims (1989)
 Riskin' It All (1991)
 Helpyourselfish (1995)
 Simpatico (1997)
 Everything Glows (2000)
 Soft Dogs (2002)
 Scare Yourself (2005)
 Monster Philosophy (2008)

Rarities
 Standin' On The Never Never (1985) - remastered and for the first time to be released on a CD.
 Behind The Seen (2009) - bonus album: including 8 previously unreleased tracks, plus 10 rare b-sides and bonus tracks.
 A biography (in English) about the life and times of D.A.D, based on a number of recent interviews with the band, by author Michael Valeur. The 160 pages are illustrated by D.A.D. bass player Stig Pedersen.

External links
 This box set on D-A-D's official homepage

D.A.D. (band) albums
2009 compilation albums